Henry Houston Salisbury (May 15, 1855 – March 29, 1933) was an American pitcher in Major League Baseball.

Salisbury was born in Providence, Rhode Island, and attended Brown University. He played in MLB for two seasons. In 1879, he had a record of 4–6 for the Troy Trojans. In 1882, he went 20–18 for the Pittsburgh Alleghenys, completing all 38 of his starts. In that 1882 season, he finished in the top 10 in several league pitching categories, including wins, earned run average (2.63), and strikeouts (135).

Salisbury died in Chicago, Illinois, at the age of 77 and was buried in Mount Hope Cemetery.

References

1855 births
1933 deaths
19th-century baseball players
Major League Baseball pitchers
Troy Trojans players
Pittsburgh Alleghenys players
St. Paul Red Caps players
Leadville Blues players
Denver (minor league baseball) players
Omaha Omahogs players
Keokuk Hawkeyes players
Denver Mountain Lions players
Baseball players from Providence, Rhode Island
Brown University alumni
Burials at Mount Hope Cemetery (Chicago)